Mere Apne is a Pakistani family drama serial aired on ARY Digital from 19 September 2021 to 1 November 2021. It is produced by Abdullah Seja under IDream Entertainment. It stars Hajra Yamin, Ali Abbas, Usama Khan and Zainab Shabbir in lead roles. The story is based on exchange marriages (watta-satta) within a family and how relationships suffer because of it.

Cast
Hajra Yamin as Neha
Ali Abbas as Omer
Usama Khan as Hamza
Zainab Shabbir as Ramsha
Zoya Nasir as Shumaila
Syed Arez as Usama
Agha Mustafa Hassan as Kashif
Waseem Abbas as Mehmood: Neha and Hamza's father
Tanveer Jamal\Firdous Jamal'' as Iqbal: Kashif, Umer, Usama and Ramsha's father
Humaira Bano as Naheed: Neha and Hamza's mother, Iqbal's sister
Inaya Khan as Maryam: Shumaila's younger sister
Ayesha Khan as Kulsoom:Kashif, Umer, Usama and Ramsha's mother
Hina Shaikh as Rabia: Shumaila's mother and Kulsooms's Sister
Maryam Parvez as Uroosa
Akhtar Ghazali as Uroosa's father (Guest Appearance)
Roohi Ghazali as Uroosa's mother (Guest Appearance)

Production

Casting
In October 2020, it was revealed that Abbas, Arez and Mustafa are going to be seen together after Kahin Deep Jaley, in the ARY new serial. Yamin, Shabbir and Nasir revealed to be the female leads of the serial later.

Tanveer Jamal,a veteran actor and cancer survivor had a relapse of the disease while shooting for the serial therefore he couldn't complete the shoot and was replaced by veteran actor "Firdous Jamal". In 30 episodes Tanveer portrayed character of Iqbal and for the rest of 17 episodes Firdous portrayed the character.

References

Pakistani family television dramas
2021 Pakistani television series debuts